Dream of a Drunk Black Southern Eagle is the name of a Bonnie 'Prince' Billy EP released in 1999 as a free item for subscribers of the French daily newspaper Libération. It contains two singles previously released in the U.S. in 1998: "One with the Birds" / "Southside of the World" and "I Am Drinking Again" / "Dreaming My Dreams".  The fifth track, "Song for the New Breed (orchestral)", is an alternate recording of "Song for the New Breed", which originally appeared on Bonnie 'Prince' Billy's I See a Darkness album in 1999. This version is exclusive to this release.

Track listing
"One with the Birds" – 5:13
"Southside of the World" – 3:04
"I Am Drinking Again" – 5:32
"Dreaming My Dreams" – 3:21
"Song for the New Breed (orchestral)" - 3:17

1999 EPs
Will Oldham albums